Turvey was a railway station on the Bedford to Northampton Line which served the village of Turvey from 1872 to 1962.

History 
Opened by the Bedford and Northampton Railway on 10 June 1872, the station was a mile from the village of Turvey. This was a result of the decision to route the line to the south of Turvey in order to avoid Turvey Abbey and the River Great Ouse. The station was therefore sited near the main road away from the village. However, a small hamlet developed around the station, including a public house called The Railway Inn. An attractive stone building was provided with two platforms. Two sidings looped from the Up line to reach a small goods yard, while a further siding just to the north served cattle pens. A signal box stood at the Olney end of the Down platform. Five trains each way ran on weekdays and none on Sundays.

Serving a rural district with only 782 residents in 1901, traffic was light. With the introduction of local bus services, passenger bookings fell from 13,207 in 1913 to 7,989 in 1922. Closure of the station to passenger traffic came on 5 March 1962, leaving the goods yard to remain open for freight until 6 January 1964. In its final years, the station saw few passengers.

Present day
The platforms have been demolished but the station building remains as offices used by LC Services Ltd which has redeveloped the rest of the site

References

Notes

Sources

Further reading

External links
 Station on a 1947 O.S, Map
The railway in Turvey

Disused railway stations in Bedfordshire
Railway stations in Great Britain opened in 1872
Railway stations in Great Britain closed in 1962
Former Midland Railway stations